The Nacra F18 Infusion is a Dutch Formula 18 catamaran sailing dinghy that was designed by Morrelli & Melvin, Vink, Larsen, Young as a one-design racer and first built in 2008.

The design takes its name from the vacuum infusion process used in its hull construction.

The Nacra F18 Infusion has been a recognized World Sailing international competition class since November 2010.

The Nacra F18 Infusion design was later developed into the F18 Evolution and the NACRA F20 Carbon.

Production
The design has been built by Nacra Sailing in the Netherlands since 2008 and remains in production.

Design
The Nacra F18 Infusion is a racing sailboat, built predominantly of epoxy resin and vinylester fibreglass over a foam core. It has a fractional sloop rig with aluminum spars. The hulls have vertical transoms, transom-hung carbon fibre rudders controlled by a tiller and dual retractable carbon fibre daggerboards.

Variants
Nacra F18 Infusion
This model was introduced in 2008. Its hulls have plumb stems and the rudders are a "kick-up" design.
Nacra F18 Infusion FCS (Flight Control System)
This sailing hydrofoil model uses the same hulls as the Infusion, but adds "L"-shaped hydrofoil rudders and "Z"-shaped carbon fibre daggerboards.
Nacra F18 Evolution
This model has the same specifications at the Infusion, but incorporates a new hull design with reverse raked stems, horizontal chines and a revised longitudinal connecting beam design. The rudders are a "kick-up" design.

See also
List of sailing boat types
List of multihulls

Related development
NACRA F20 Carbon

References

External links
 Nacra F18 Infusion and Nacra F18 Infusion FCS official webpage
 Nacra F18 Evolution official webpage
 Video: Nacra F18 Infusion
 Video: 2016/17 Nacra F18 Infusion Nationals

Dinghies
Catamarans
2000s sailboat type designs
Sailboat type designs by Gino Morrelli
Sailboat type designs by Pete Melvin
Sailboat types built by Nacra Sailing